Tulegatan is a street in Stockholm. It is located in the district of Vasastaden.

Streets in Stockholm